The 2005–06 NC State Wolfpack men's basketball team represented North Carolina State University as a member of the Atlantic Coast Conference during the 2005–06 men's college basketball season. It was Herb Sendek's 10th season as head coach. The Wolfpack earned a bid to the NCAA tournament, reached the Second round, and finished with a record of 22–10 (10–6 ACC).

Roster

Schedule and results

|-
!colspan=9 style=| Regular Season

|-
!colspan=9 style=| ACC Tournament

|-
!colspan=9 style=| NCAA Tournament

Rankings

References

NC State Wolfpack men's basketball seasons
Nc State
NC State Wolfpack men's basketball
NC State Wolfpack men's basketball
Nc State